Charles R. Marion was a screenwriter. He worked on dozens of films. He married actress Elena Verdugo. They had one son, Richard Marion (1949–1999), who became an actor and director. After their divorce she remarried.

Filmography
Spooks Run Wild (1941)
Smart Guy (film) (1943)
Campus Rhythm (1943)
The Dark Horse (1946 film) 
The Rose Bowl Story (1952)
The Roar of the Crowd (1953)
Hot News (1953)
Apache Territory (1958)

References

Year of birth missing (living people)
Living people